The compound of six tetrahedra with rotational freedom is a uniform polyhedron compound made of a symmetric arrangement of 6 tetrahedra, considered as antiprisms. It can be constructed by superimposing six tetrahedra within a cube, and then rotating them in pairs about the three axes that pass through the centres of two opposite cubic faces. Each tetrahedron is rotated by an equal (and opposite, within a pair) angle θ. Equivalently, a tetrahedron may be inscribed within each cube in the compound of six cubes with rotational freedom, in such a way as to preserve tetrahedral symmetry. 

When θ = 0, all six tetrahedra coincide. When θ is 45 degrees, the more symmetric compound of six tetrahedra (without rotational freedom) arises.

Gallery

References 
.

Polyhedral compounds